Furman is a town in Hampton County, South Carolina, United States. The population was 224 at the 2020 census, down from 239 at the 2010 census. It is not to be confused with Furman University, which is in Greenville, South Carolina.

Geography
Furman is located in southwestern Hampton County at  (32.681247, -81.187705). U.S. Route 601 (Savannah Highway) passes through the town center, leading north  to Hampton, the county seat, and south  to its terminus at U.S. Route 321.

Demographics

As of the census of 2000, there were 286 people, 108 households, and 80 families residing in the town. The population density was 91.8 people per square mile (35.4/km2). There were 126 housing units at an average density of 40.4 per square mile (15.6/km2). The racial makeup of the town was 27.62% White and 72.38% African American.

There were 108 households, out of which 38.0% had children under the age of 18 living with them, 50.0% were married couples living together, 18.5% had a female householder with no husband present, and 25.9% were non-families. 23.1% of all households were made up of individuals, and 6.5% had someone living alone who was 65 years of age or older. The average household size was 2.65 and the average family size was 3.11.

In the town, the population was spread out, with 29.7% under the age of 18, 9.1% from 18 to 24, 25.2% from 25 to 44, 21.3% from 45 to 64, and 14.7% who were 65 years of age or older. The median age was 35 years. For every 100 females, there were 90.7 males. For every 100 females age 18 and over, there were 91.4 males.

The median income for a household in the town was $23,125, and the median income for a family was $27,750. Males had a median income of $25,795 versus $17,292 for females. The per capita income for the town was $12,227. About 19.0% of families and 30.7% of the population were below the poverty line, including 44.4% of those under the age of eighteen and 17.5% of those 65 or over.

Southern Railway in Furman

From 1899 until the 1980s, the Southern Railway operated a line through Furman and nearby Allendale, Tarboro, and Lena. Called the "Southern Columbia to Savannah Route", the rail also ran through Barnwell and Blackville to the north. Its primary purpose was to increase north–south passenger and freight traffic by feeding into the Atlantic Coast Line at Hardeeville for passage south to Florida or north to Charleston and other points. The rail line was built to compete with another north–south rail line operated nearby by the Seaboard Air Line (also called the Florida Central & Peninsular, Seaboard Coast Line, and presently CSX) which ran a different course through Denmark, Fairfax, Estill, and Garnett (parallel to US 321) and then into Georgia. Between 1963 and 1970, Southern abandoned its tracks between Furman and Hardeeville, leaving Furman as the ending station from Columbia. In the early 1980s, Southern abandoned its tracks south of Blackville, ending its rail service to Barnwell, Allendale, and Furman. However, by the 1970s, any rail service to Furman would have been a rare event.

External links
 Information on the Town of Furman from Hampton County

References

Towns in Hampton County, South Carolina
Towns in South Carolina